Legs to Make Us Longer is the second album by American guitarist Kaki King, released in 2004.

The songs "Frame" and "Doing the Wrong Thing" were featured in the film Into the Wild (2007).

Reception

In his review for Allmusic, critic Thom Jurek summarized that "King is a major talent, an iconoclastic figure who is this era's only new voice on the acoustic guitar, even as she explores other compelling sonic and musical avenues."

Track listing
All tracks written by Kaki King

"Frame" – 2:04
"Playing With Pink Noise" – 3:02
"Ingots" – 3:53
"Doing the Wrong Thing" – 5:04
"Solipsist" – 2:30
"Neanderthal" – 4:28
"Can the Gwot Save Us?" – 4:20
"Lies" – 4:55
"All the Landslides Birds Have Seen Since the Beginning of the World" – 2:42
"Magazine" – 4:08
"My Insect Life" – 10:34

Personnel
Kaki King – guitar
Will Calhoun – drums
Hector Castillo – bass drums
Erik Friedlander – cello
Joyce Hammann – violin, viola
Conrad Korsch – upright bass
Ben Perowsky – drums
David Torn – bass, piano, drums
T. Xiques – cymbals

Production
Producer – David Torn
Executive Producer – Jeff Patrick Krasno
Engineer – Hector Castillo
Assistant Engineers – Nishiki Ichiho, James Reagan
Mixing – Hector Castillo, David Torn
Mixing Assistants – Nishiki Ichiho, James Reagan
Mastering – Greg Calbi
A&R – Kaz Utsunomiya
Assistants – Chris Powers, Sean Price
Product Manager – Scott Greeg
Arranger – David Torn
Art direction – Brian Ponto
Photography – Ian Allen

References

Kaki King albums
2004 albums
Epic Records albums
Albums produced by David Torn